Sudbury Hill is an area of the London Borough of Harrow in northwest London, England. It forms part of the HA1 postcode and Harrow post town.

Located immediately north of North Greenford and almost a mile from its namesake Sudbury, Sudbury Hill was originally an ancient link between Harrow on the Hill and Wembley, which survives today as the A4005. The area has two railway stations, Sudbury Hill Harrow railway station and Sudbury Hill tube station, which are both located on the Greenford Road (south of the Sudbury Hill A4005 road itself).

Neighbouring areas

Gallery

References

Areas of London
Districts of the London Borough of Brent